Jeevan Thondaman (born 9 November 1994) is a Sri Lankan politician, Member of Parliament and state minister.

Thondaman was born on 9 November 1994. He is the son of Arumugam Thondaman and great-grandson of Savumiamoorthy Thondaman, former leaders of the Ceylon Workers' Congress (CWC) and government ministers. He was educated at Gateway Primary School, Colombo, Lady Andal, Chennai and Chinmaya International Residential School, Coimbatore. After school he joined Northumbria University, graduating in 2017 with a LLB degree.

Thondaman interned at a law firm in London. He then returned to Sri Lanka to assist his father in his political and trade union work. In December 2017 a court order was issued to arrest him in connection with an assault on a National Union of Workers supporter at a funeral in Maskeliya.

In June 2020, following the death of his father, Thondaman was appointed general-secretary of the CWC. He contested the 2020 parliamentary election as a Sri Lanka People's Freedom Alliance electoral alliance candidate in Nuwara Eliya District and was elected to the Parliament of Sri Lanka. After the election he was appointed State Minister of Estate Housing and Community Infrastructure.

References

1994 births
Alumni of Northumbria University
Indian Tamil politicians of Sri Lanka
Ceylon Workers' Congress politicians
Living people
Members of the 16th Parliament of Sri Lanka
Sri Lankan Hindus
Sri Lanka People's Freedom Alliance politicians
State ministers of Sri Lanka